The Science Citation Index Expanded – previously entitled Science Citation Index – is a citation index originally produced by the Institute for Scientific Information (ISI) and created by Eugene Garfield. It was officially launched in 1964 and is now owned by Clarivate (previously the Intellectual Property and Science business of Thomson Reuters). The indexing database covers more than 9,200 notable and significant journals, across 178 disciplines, from 1900 to the present. These are alternatively described as the world's leading journals of science and technology, because of a rigorous selection process.

Accessibility
The index is available online within Web of Science, as part of its Core Collection (there are also CD and printed editions, covering a smaller number of journals). The database allows researchers to search through over 53 million records from thousands of academic journals that were published by publishers from around the world.

Chemistry Citation Index
Clarivate previously marketed several subsets of this database, termed "Specialty Citation Indexes", such as the Neuroscience Citation Index and the Chemistry Citation Index, however these databases are no longer actively maintained.

The Chemistry Citation Index was first introduced by Eugene Garfield, a chemist by training. His original "search examples were based on [his] experience as a chemist". In 1992, an electronic and print form of the index was derived from a core of 330 chemistry journals, within which all areas were covered. Additional information was provided from articles selected from 4,000 other journals. All chemistry subdisciplines were covered: organic, inorganic, analytical, physical chemistry, polymer, computational, organometallic, materials chemistry, and electrochemistry.

By 2002, the core journal coverage increased to 500 and related article coverage increased to 8,000 other journals.

One 1980 study reported the overall citation indexing benefits for chemistry, examining the use of citations as a tool for the study of the sociology of chemistry and illustrating the use of citation data to "observe" chemistry subfields over time.

See also
Arts and Humanities Citation Index, which covers 1,130 journals, beginning with 1975.
Emerging Sources Citation Index
Google Scholar
Impact factor
List of academic databases and search engines
Social Sciences Citation Index, which covers 1,700 journals, beginning with 1956.

References

Further reading

External links

 Introduction to SCIE
 Master journal list
 Chemical Information Sources/ Author and Citation Searches. on WikiBooks. 
 Cited Reference Searching: An Introduction. Thomson Reuters. 
 Chemistry Citation Index. Chinweb.

Citation indices
Online databases
Clarivate
1964 establishments